Michael James Derham (1889 – 20 November 1923) was an Irish Sinn Féin and later Cumann na nGaedheal politician who served for two years as a Teachta Dála (TD) for the Dublin County constituency.

He was returned unopposed as one of six Sinn Féin candidates at the 1921 elections to the new House of Commons of Southern Ireland, which had been established under the Government of Ireland Act 1920. In common with the other Sinn Féin members elected, he did not take his seat in the short-lived new Commons, sitting instead in the revolutionary Second Dáil.

Derham was re-elected as a Pro-Treaty Sinn Féin candidate at the 1922 general election, and as a candidate for the new Cumann na nGaedheal party at the 1923 general election. He died suddenly less than three months later, in November, triggering a by-election, which was won on 19 March 1924 by the Cumann na nGaedheal candidate, Batt O'Connor.

References

External links
 

1889 births
1923 deaths
Cumann na nGaedheal TDs
Members of the 2nd Dáil
Members of the 3rd Dáil
Members of the 4th Dáil
Early Sinn Féin TDs
People of the Irish Civil War (Pro-Treaty side)